The common surface features of Mars include dark slope streaks, dust devil tracks, sand dunes, Medusae Fossae Formation, fretted terrain, layers, gullies, glaciers, scalloped topography, chaos terrain, possible ancient rivers, pedestal craters, brain terrain, and ring mold craters.

Slope streaks

A new phenomenon known as slope streaks has been uncovered by the HiRISE camera on the Mars Reconnaissance Orbiter. These features appear on crater walls and other slopes, and they are thin and many hundreds of metres long. The streaks have been observed to grow slowly over the course of a year or so, always beginning at a point source. Newly formed streaks are dark in colour but fade as they age until white. The cause is unknown, but theories range from dry dust avalanches (the favoured theory) to brine seepage.

Examples of dark slope streaks from various parts of Mars are shown below. Click on image to get a better view.

Recurrent slope lineae

Recurrent slope lineae are small dark streaks on slopes that elongate in warm seasons.  They may be evidence of liquid water.

Dust devil tracks
Many areas on Mars experience the passage of giant dust devils. A thin coating of fine bright dust covers most of the Martian surface. When a dust devil travels by, it blows away the coating and exposes the underlying dark surface. These dust devils have been seen both from the ground and from orbit. They have even blown the dust off the solar panels of the Spirit and Opportunity Rovers on Mars, greatly extending their lives. The twin Rovers were designed to last for 3 months; instead, Spirit lasted for 6 years, 77 days, while Opportunity continued to operate for a staggering 14 years, 136 days. The pattern of the tracks have been shown to change every few months.

Layers

Many places on Mars show rocks arranged in layers. Rock can form layers in a variety of ways.  Volcanoes, wind, or water can produce layers.
A detailed discussion of layering with many Martian examples can be found in Sedimentary Geology of Mars.  Layers can be hardened by the action of groundwater.  Martian ground water probably moved hundreds of kilometers, and in the process it dissolved many minerals from the rock it passed through.  When ground water surfaces in low areas containing sediments, water evaporates in the thin atmosphere and leaves behind minerals as deposits and/or cementing agents. Consequently, layers of dust could not later easily erode away since they were cemented together.

Layers in Ice Cap

Sand dunes
Many locations on Mars have sand dunes. An erg (or sand sea), made up of aeolian dune fields referred to as the Circumpolar Dune Field surrounds most of the north polar cap. The dunes are covered by a seasonal carbon dioxide frost that forms in early autumn and remains until late spring. Many martian dunes strongly resemble terrestrial dunes but images acquired by the High-Resolution Imaging Science Experiment on the Mars Reconnaissance Orbiter have shown that martian dunes in the north polar region are subject to modification via grainflow triggered by seasonal  sublimation, a process not seen on Earth. Many dunes are black because they are derived from the dark volcanic rock basalt. Extraterrestrial sand seas such as those found on Mars are referred to as "undae" from the Latin for waves.

Gullies

Martian gullies are small, incised networks of narrow channels and their associated downslope sediment deposits, found on the planet of Mars. They are named for their resemblance to terrestrial gullies. First discovered on images from Mars Global Surveyor, they occur on steep slopes, especially on the walls of craters. Usually, each gully has a dendritic alcove at its head, a fan-shaped apron at its base, and a single thread of incised channel linking the two, giving the whole gully an hourglass shape. They are believed to be relatively young because they have few, if any craters.

On the basis of their form, aspects, positions, and location amongst and apparent interaction with features thought to be rich in water ice, many researchers believed that the processes carving the gullies involve liquid water. However, this remains a topic of active research.

Gullies on Dunes
Gullies are found on some dunes.  These are somewhat different from gullies in other places, like the walls of craters.  Gullies on dunes seem to keep the same width for a long distance and often just end with a pit, instead of an apron.  They are often just a few meters across with raised banks along the sides.   Many of these gullies are found on dunes in Russell (Martian crater).  In the winter dry ice accumulates on the dunes and then in the spring dark spots appear and dark-toned streaks grow downhill.  After the dry ice is gone, new channels are visible.  These gullies may be caused by blocks of dry ice moving down the steep slope or perhaps from dry ice starts the sand moving.  In the thin atmosphere of mars, dry ice will expel carbon dioxide with vigor.

Medusae Fossae Formation
The Medusae Fossae Formation is a soft, easily eroded deposit that extends for nearly 1,000 km along the equator of Mars. Sometimes the formation appears as a smooth and gently undulating surface; however, in places it is wind-sculpted into ridges and grooves. Radar imaging has suggested that the region may contain either extremely porous rock (for example volcanic ash) or deep layers of glacier-like ice deposits amounting to about the same quantity as is stored in Mars' south polar cap.

The lower portion (member) of Medusae Fossae Formation contains many patterns and shapes that are thought to be the remains of streams. It is believed that streams formed valleys that were filled and became resistant to erosion by cementation of minerals or by the gathering of a coarse covering layer. These inverted stream beds are sometimes called sinuous ridges or raised curvilinear features. They may be a kilometer or so in length. Their height ranges from a meter to greater than 10 meters, while the width of the narrow ones is less than 10 meters.

The wind has eroded the surface of the formation into a series of linear ridges called yardangs. These ridges generally point in the direction of the prevailing winds that carved them and demonstrate the erosive power of martian winds. The easily eroded nature of the Medusae Fossae Formation suggests that it is composed of weakly cemented particles, and was most likely formed by the deposition of wind-blown dust or volcanic ash. Layers are seen in parts of the formation. A resistant caprock on the top of yardangs has been observed in Viking, Mars Global Surveyor, and HiRISE photos. Very few impact craters are visible throughout the area so the surface is relatively young.

Yardangs

Yardangs are common in some regions on Mars, especially in the Medusae Fossae Formation of the Amazonis quadrangle and near the equator.  They are formed by the action of wind on sand sized particles; hence they often point in the direction that the winds were blowing when they were formed. Because they exhibit very few impact craters they are believed to be relatively young.

Fretted terrain
Fretted terrain is a type of surface feature common to certain areas of Mars and discovered in Mariner 9 images. It lies between two different surfaces. The surface of Mars can be divided into two parts: low, young, uncratered plains that cover most of the northern hemisphere, and high-standing, old, heavily cratered areas that cover the southern hemisphere and a small part of the northern hemisphere. Between these two zones is the fretted terrain, containing a complicated mix of cliffs, mesas, buttes, and straight-walled and sinuous canyons. Fretted terrain contains smooth, flat lowlands along with steep cliffs. The scarps or cliffs are usually 1 to 2 km high. Channels in the area have wide, flat floors and steep walls. Fretted terrain is most common in northern Arabia, between latitudes 30°N and 50°N and longitudes 270°W and 360°W. Parts of the fretted terrain are called Deuteronilus Mensae and Protonilus Mensae.

In fretted terrain, the land seems to transition from narrow straight valleys to isolated mesas. Most of the mesas are surrounded by forms that have been called a variety of names (circum-mesa aprons, debris aprons, rock glaciers, and lobate debris aprons). At first they appeared to resemble rock glaciers on Earth, but scientists could not be sure. Eventually, proof of their true nature was discovered by radar studies with the Mars Reconnaissance Orbiter and showed that they contain pure water ice covered with a thin layer of rocks that insulated the ice.

In addition to rock covered glaciers around mesas, the region has many steep-walled valleys with lineations—ridges and grooves—on their floors. The material comprising these valley floors is called lineated valley fill. In some of the best images taken by the Viking Orbiters, some of the valley fill appeared to resemble alpine glaciers on Earth. Given this similarity, some scientists assumed that the lineations on these valley floors might have formed by flow of ice in (and perhaps through) these canyons and valleys. Today, it is generally agreed that glacial flow caused the lineations.

Glaciers
Glaciers, loosely defined as patches of currently or recently flowing ice, are thought to be present across large but restricted areas of the modern Martian surface, and are inferred to have been more widely distributed at times in the past.  

|

Concentric crater fill

Concentric crater fill, like lobate debris aprons and lineated valley fill, is believed to be ice-rich.  Based on accurate topography measures of height at different points in these craters and calculations of how deep the craters should be based on their diameters, it is thought that the craters are 80% filled with mostly ice. That is, they hold hundreds of meters of material that probably consists of ice with a few tens of meters of surface debris. The ice accumulated in the crater from snowfall in previous climates.  Recent modeling suggests that concentric crater fill develops over many cycles in which snow is deposited, then moves into the crater.  Once inside the crater, shade and dust preserve the snow.  The snow changes to ice.  The many concentric lines are created by the many cycles of snow accumulation. Generally snow accumulates whenever the axial tilt reaches 35 degrees.

Mesas

Chaos terrain
Chaos terrain is believed to be associated with the release of huge amounts of water. The chaotic features may have collapsed when water came out of the surface. Martian outflow channels commonly begin with a Chaos region. A chaotic region can be recognized by a tangle of mesas, buttes, and hills, all chopped through with valleys which in places look almost patterned. Some parts of this chaotic area have not collapsed completely—they are still formed into large mesas, so they may still contain water ice. Chaotic terrain occurs in numerous locations on Mars, and always gives the strong impression that something abruptly disturbed the ground. Chaos regions formed long ago. By counting craters (more craters in any given area means an older surface) and by studying the valleys' relations with other geological features, scientists have concluded the channels formed 2.0 to 3.8 billion years ago.

Upper plains unit

Remnants of a 50–100 meter thick mantling, called the upper plains unit, has been discovered in the mid-latitudes of Mars.  First investigated in the Deuteronilus Mensae region, but it occurs in other places as well.  The remnants consist of sets of dipping layers in craters and along mesas. Sets of dipping layers may be of various sizes and shapes—some look like Aztec pyramids from Central America.

This unit also degrades into brain terrain.  Brain terrain is a region of maze-like ridges 3–5 meters high.  Some ridges may consist of an ice core, so they may be sources of water for future colonists.

Some regions of the upper plains unit display large fractures and troughs with raised rims; such regions are called ribbed upper plains.  Fractures are believed to have started with small cracks from stresses.  Stress is suggested to initiate the fracture process since ribbed upper plains are common when debris aprons come together or near the edge of debris aprons—such sites would generate compressional stresses.  Cracks exposed more surfaces, and consequently more ice in the material sublimates into the planet's thin atmosphere.  Eventually, small cracks become large canyons or troughs. Small cracks often contain small pits and chains of pits; these are thought to be from sublimation of ice in the ground.
Large areas of the Martian surface are loaded with ice that is protected by a meters thick layer of dust and other material.  However, if cracks appear, a fresh surface will expose ice to the thin atmosphere.  In a short time, the ice will disappear into the cold, thin atmosphere in a process called sublimation.  Dry ice behaves in a similar fashion on the Earth.  On Mars sublimation has been observed when the Phoenix lander uncovered chunks of ice that disappeared in a few days.  In addition, HiRISE has seen fresh craters with ice at the bottom.  After a time, HiRISE saw the ice deposit disappear.

The upper plains unit is thought to have fallen from the sky.  It drapes various surfaces, as if it fell evenly.  As is the case for other mantle deposits, the upper plains unit has layers, is fine-grained, and is ice-rich. It is widespread; it does not seem to have a point source.  The surface appearance of some regions of Mars is due to how this unit has degraded.  It is a major cause of the surface appearance of lobate debris aprons.
The layering of the upper plains mantling unit and other mantling units are believed to be caused by major changes in the planet's climate.  Models predict that the obliquity or tilt of the rotational axis has varied from its present 25 degrees to maybe over 80 degrees over geological time.  Periods of high tilt will cause the ice in the polar caps to be redistributed and change the amount of dust in the atmosphere.

Latitude dependent mantle

Much of the Martian surface is covered with a thick ice-rich, mantle layer that has fallen from the sky a number of times in the past.   In some places a number of layers are visible in the mantle.

It fell as snow and ice-coated dust.  There is good evidence that this mantle is ice-rich.  The shapes of the polygons common on many surfaces suggest ice-rich soil.  High levels of hydrogen (probably from water) have been found with Mars Odyssey.  Thermal measurements from orbit suggest ice.  The Phoenix Lander found water ice directly since it landed in a field of polygons and its landing rockets exposed a pure ice surface.   Theory had predicted that ice would be found under a few cm of soil.  This mantle layer is called "latitude dependent mantle" because its occurrence is related to the latitude.  It is this mantle that cracks and then forms polygonal ground. This cracking of ice-rich ground is predicted based on physical processes. 

 ,

Polygonal patterned ground

Polygonal, patterned ground is quite common in some regions of Mars.  It is commonly believed to be caused by the sublimation of ice from the ground. Sublimation is the direct change of solid ice to a gas.  This is similar to what happens to dry ice on the Earth.  Places on Mars that display polygonal ground may indicate where future colonists can find water ice.  Patterned ground forms in a mantle layer, called latitude dependent mantle, that fell from the sky when the climate was different.

,

Scalloped topography
Scalloped topography is common in the mid-latitudes of Mars, between 45° and 60° north and south. It is particularly prominent in the region of Utopia Planitia in the northern hemisphere and in the region of Peneus and Amphitrites Patera in the southern hemisphere. Such topography consists of shallow, rimless depressions with scalloped edges, commonly referred to as "scalloped depressions" or simply "scallops". Scalloped depressions can be isolated or clustered and sometimes seem to coalesce. A typical scalloped depression displays a gentle equator-facing slope and a steeper pole-facing scarp. This topographic asymmetry is probably due to differences in insolation. Scalloped depressions are believed to form from the removal of subsurface material, possibly interstitial ice, by sublimation. This process may still be happening at present.

On November 22, 2016, NASA reported finding a large amount of underground ice in the Utopia Planitia region of Mars. The volume of water detected has been estimated to be equivalent to the volume of water in Lake Superior.
The volume of water ice in the region were based on measurements from the ground-penetrating radar instrument on Mars Reconnaissance Orbiter, called SHARAD.  From the data obtained from SHARAD, “dielectric permittivity”, or the dielectric constant was determined. The dielectric constant value was consistent with a large concentration of water ice.

 ,

Ancient rivers?

There is great deal of evidence that water once flowed in river valleys on Mars.  Pictures from orbit show winding valleys, branched valleys, and even meanders with oxbow lakes.  Some are visible in the pictures below.

Streamlined shapes
Streamlined shapes represent more evidence of past flowing water on Mars.  Water shaped features into streamlined shapes.

Deltas

Pedestal crater
Pedestal craters are believed to be caused by a crater's ejecta protecting the material beneath it from eroding.  The underlying material is probably ice-rich; hence these craters indicate where and how much ice was present in the ground.

Halo Craters

Boulders

Brain terrain
Brain terrain is a feature of the Martian surface, consisting of complex ridges found on lobate debris aprons, lineated valley fill and concentric crater fill.  It is so named because it suggests the ridges on the surface of the human brain.  Wide ridges are called closed-cell brain terrain, and the less common narrow ridges are called open-cell brain terrain.  It is thought that the wide closed-cell terrain contains a core of ice, and when the ice disappears the center of the wide ridge collapses to produce the narrow ridges of the open-cell brain terrain.

Ring mold craters

Ring mold craters are believed to be formed from asteroid impacts into ground that has an underlying layer of ice.  The impact produces an rebound of the ice layer to form a "ring-mold" shape.

Rootless Cones
Rootless cones are caused by explosions of lava with ground ice under the flow. The ice melts and turns into a vapor that expands in an explosion that produces a cone or ring. Features like these are found in Iceland, when lavas cover water-saturated substrates.

Mud volcanoes
Some features look like volcanoes.  Some of them may be mud volcanoes where pressurized mud is forced upward forming cones.  These features may be places to look for life as they bring to the surface possible life that has been protected from radiation.

Lava flows

Linear Ridge Networks

Linear ridge networks are found in various places on Mars in and around craters.   Ridges often appear as mostly straight segments that intersect in a lattice-like manner.  They are hundreds of meters long, tens of meters high, and several meters wide.  It is thought that impacts created fractures in the surface, these fractures later acted as channels for fluids.  Fluids cemented the structures.  With the passage of time, surrounding material was eroded away, thereby leaving hard ridges behind.
Since the ridges occur in locations with clay, these formations could serve as a marker for clay which requires water for its formation.

Fractures forming blocks
In places large fractures break up surfaces.  Sometimes straight edges are formed and large cubes are created by the fractures.

Volcanoes under ice
There is evidence that volcanoes sometimes erupt under ice, as they do on Earth at times.  What seems to happen it that much ice melts, the water goes away, and then the surface cracks and collapses.  These exhibit concentric fractures and large pieces of ground that seemed to have been pulled apart.  Sites like this may have recently had held liquid water, hence they may be fruitful places to search for evidence of life.

Noctis Labyrinthus

Defrosting

In the spring, various shapes appear because frost is disappearing from the surface, exposing the underling dark soil.  Also, in some places dust is blown out of in geyser-like eruptions that are sometimes called "spiders."  If a wind is blowing, the material creates a long, dark streak or fan.

During the winter, much frost accumulates.  It freezes out directly onto the surface of the permanent polar cap, which is made of water ice covered with layers of dust and sand.  The deposit begins as a layer of dusty  frost. Over the winter, it recrystallizes and becomes denser. The dust and sand particles caught in the frost slowly sink. By the time temperatures rise in the spring, the frost layer has become a slab of semi-transparent ice about 3 feet thick, lying on a substrate of dark sand and dust.  This dark material absorbs light and causes the ice to sublimate (turn directly into a gas).  Eventually much gas accumulates and becomes pressurized.  When it finds a weak spot, the gas escapes and blows out the dust.  Speeds can reach 100 miles per hour. Dark channels can sometimes be seen; they are called "spiders."  The surface appears covered with dark spots when this process is occurring.

Many ideas have been advanced to explain these features.  These features can be seen in some of the pictures below.

See also
 
 
 
 
 
  
 
 
  
 
 
  
 
 
 
 
 —recurrent slope lineae

References

Recommended reading
Lorenz, R.  2014.  The Dune Whisperers.  The Planetary Report: 34, 1, 8–14
Lorenz, R., J. Zimbelman.  2014.  Dune Worlds:  How Windblown Sand Shapes Planetary Landscapes. Springer Praxis Books / Geophysical Sciences.
 Grotzinger, J. and R. Milliken (eds.).  2012.  Sedimentary Geology of Mars.  SEPM.

External links 
 
 

Surface features of Mars